The 2020 World Wheelchair-B Curling Championship was held from April 10 to 15, 2021 in Lohja, Finland. The top three placing teams qualified for the 2021 World Wheelchair Curling Championship in Beijing, China. The United States won the gold medal, defeating the previously undefeated Switzerland 4–3 in the final. Italy took the bronze medal and final berth at the 2021 World Championship with an 8–4 win over Germany in the bronze medal game.

Teams
The teams are as follows:

Round-robin standings
Final round-robin standings

Round-robin results
All draw times are listed in Eastern European Summer Time (UTC+03:00).

Draw 1
Saturday, April 10, 2:30 pm

Draw 2
Saturday, April 10, 6:30 pm

Draw 3
Sunday, April 11, 9:30 am

Draw 4
Sunday, April 11, 2:00 pm

Draw 5
Sunday, April 11, 6:30 pm

Draw 6
Monday, April 12, 9:30 am

Draw 7
Monday, April 12, 2:00 pm

Draw 8
Monday, April 12, 6:30 pm

Draw 9
Tuesday, April 13, 9:30 am

Draw 10
Tuesday, April 13, 2:00 pm

Draw 11
Tuesday, April 13, 6:30 pm

Draw 12
Wednesday, April 14, 9:30 am

Draw 13
Wednesday, April 14, 2:00 pm

Draw 14
Wednesday, April 14, 6:30 pm

Playoffs

Semifinals
Thursday, April 15, 10:00 am

Bronze medal game
Thursday, April 15, 3:00 pm

Final
Thursday, April 15, 3:00 pm

References

External links

World Wheelchair Curling Championship
World Wheelchair-B Curling Championship
International curling competitions hosted by Finland
Sports competitions in Lohja
World Wheelchair-B Curling Championship
World Wheelchair-B Curling Championship